Jasmine Tessari (born 1 April 1996) is an Italian ice dancer. With her former skating partner, Francesco Fioretti, she has won six international medals and is a four-time Italian national  medalist. They have competed in the final segment at one ISU Championship.

As of July 2021, she is competing with Stéphane Walker for Switzerland. They are the 2022 Swiss national champions.

Personal life 
Tessari was born on 1 April 1996 in Basiglio, Italy. She is the daughter of Italian single skater and coach Cristina Mauri.

Career

Early career 
Tessari first stepped onto the ice as a one-year-old but was not interested in skating at that age; she returned to skating when she was five. As a single skater, she was coached by her mother, Cristina Mauri, at Mediolanum Forum di Assago.

At age 14, Tessari teamed up with her first ice dancing partner, Stefano Colafato. The two made their international junior debut in November 2010 at the Pavel Roman Memorial. Their ISU Junior Grand Prix debut came in September 2011. In January, they placed eighth at the 2012 Winter Youth Olympics in Innsbruck, Austria.

Tessari/Colafato were coached by Roberto Pelizzola and Nicoletta Lunghi at Forum S.S.D.R.L. Their last competition together was the Santa Claus Cup in December 2014. They decided to part ways due to problems in their partnership.

2015–2016 season 
Barbara Fusar-Poli asked Tessari to try out with Francesco Fioretti. After a few months of skating together, Tessari/Fioretti formalized their partnership. The two made their international debut in September 2015, at the Lombardia Trophy. They finished fourth at the Italian Championships.

2016–2017 season 
Tessari/Fioretti won bronze at the 2016 NRW Trophy. After becoming the Italian national bronze medalists, they were sent to the 2017 European Championships in Ostrava, Czech Republic; they finished 22nd in the short dance and did not advance further.

2017–2018 season 
In December 2017, Tessari/Fioretti won bronze at the Italian Championships. In January, they qualified to the free dance and finished 18th overall at the 2018 European Championships in Moscow, Russia. They concluded their season with silver medals at the Bavarian Open and Egna Spring Trophy.

2018–2019 season 
Tessari/Fioretti opened their season with silver at the 2018 NRW Trophy and then placed fourth at two ISU Challenger Series events, the 2018 CS Lombardia Trophy and 2018 CS Ondrej Nepela Trophy. They took bronze at the 2018 Ice Star in October. In November, the two debuted on the Grand Prix series, placing eighth at the 2018 Grand Prix of Helsinki.  After winning the silver medal at the Italian Championships, Tessari/Fioretti placed fourteenth at the European Championships, and attended their first World Championships, where they placed twenty-fourth.

2019–2020 season 
Tessari/Fioretti placed twelfth at the 2019 CS Lombardia Trophy to begin the season, before making their second appearance on the Grand Prix at the 2019 Rostelecom Cup, where they placed tenth.  After their second consecutive national silver medal, the two competed at the 2020 European Championships, placing sixteenth.  This would prove to be their final competition together, as their partnership ended afterward.

2021–2022 season & new partnership 
In July, it was announced that Tessari had teamed up with Swiss skater Stéphane Walker, and that the two would be competing for Switzerland. Tessari/Walker won the Swiss national title in their inaugural season, and then debuted at the European Championships with a nineteenth-place finish.

Programs

With Walker

With Fioretti

With Colafato

Competitive highlights 
GP: Grand Prix; CS: Challenger Series; JGP: Junior Grand Prix

With Walker

With Fioretti

With Colafato

Ladies' singles

References

External links 

 

1996 births
Italian female ice dancers
Living people
Figure skaters from Milan
Figure skaters at the 2012 Winter Youth Olympics
20th-century Italian women
21st-century Italian women